Morada may refer to:

Places
 Morada, California, a census-designated place, and suburb of Stockton, in San Joaquin County
 Morada, Mindelo, city center
 Morada Nova, a municipality in the state of Ceará in the Northeast region of Brazil.

Other uses
 Morada (company), a British curtain manufacturer, in Altham, Lancashire
 Morada (Odisha Vidhan Sabha constituency)
 , a religious meeting hall associated with the Penitente Brotherhood of New Mexico